Alvania dorbignyi is a species of minute sea snail, a marine gastropod mollusk or micromollusk in the family Rissoidae.

Subspecies : Alvania dorbignyi perversa F. Nordsieck, 1972 (taxon inquirendum)

Description

Distribution

References

 Savigny, J-.C., 1817 Description de l'Egypte, ou recueil des observations et des recherches qui ont été faites en Egypte pendant l'expédition de l'Armée française, publié par les ordres de sa Majesté l'Empereur Napoléon le Grand. Histoire Naturelle, p. 339 pp
 Gofas, S.; Le Renard, J.; Bouchet, P. (2001). Mollusca. in: Costello, M.J. et al. (eds), European Register of Marine Species: a check-list of the marine species in Europe and a bibliography of guides to their identification. Patrimoines Naturels. 50: 180-213

External links
 J.V., 1826 Explication sommaire des planches (Mollusques - Annelides - Crustacés - Arachnides - Insectes - Echinodermes - Zoophytes - Ascidies - Polypes - Hydrophytes - Oiseaux) dont les dessins ont été fournis par M.J.C. Savigny, pour l'histoire naturelle de l'ouvrage. Description de l'Égypte, ou recueil des observations et des recherches qui ont été faites en Égypte pendant l'expédition de l'armée française, publié par les ordres de Sa Majesté l'empereur Napoléon le Grand. , vol. 1(4), p. 7-56
 Katsanevakis, S.; Bogucarskis, K.; Gatto, F.; Vandekerkhove, J.; Deriu, I.; Cardoso A.S. (2012). Building the European Alien Species Information Network (EASIN): a novel approach for the exploration of distributed alien species data. BioInvasions Records. 1: 235-245
 Bouchet P. & Danrigal F. (1982). Napoleon's Egyptian Campaign (1798-1801) and the Savigny collection of shells. The Nautilus, 96(1): 9-24
 Zenetos, A.; Gofas, S.; Verlaque, M.; Cinar, M.; Garcia Raso, J.; Bianchi, C.; Morri, C.; Azzurro, E.; Bilecenoglu, M.; Froglia, C.; Siokou, I.; Violanti, D.; Sfriso, A.; San Martin, G.; Giangrande, A.; Katagan, T.; Ballesteros, E.; Ramos-Espla, A.; Mastrototaro, F.; Ocana, O.; Zingone, A.; Gambi, M.; Streftaris, N. (2010). Alien species in the Mediterranean Sea by 2010. A contribution to the application of European Union's Marine Strategy Framework Directive (MSFD). Part I. Spatial distribution. Mediterranean Marine Science. 11(2): 381-493

Rissoidae
Gastropods described in 1826